Sông Hinh is a rural district (huyện) of Phú Yên province in the South Central Coastal region of Vietnam. Its name is the same as the river running through the district, the Hinh River. As of 2003 the district had a population of 380,102. The district covers an area of 885 km². The district capital lies at Hai Riêng.

Sông Hinh district is subdivided to 11 commune-level subdivisions, including Hai Riêng township, and the rural communes of: Đức Bình Đông, Đức Bình Tây, Ea Bá, Ea Bar, Ea Bia, Ea Lâm, Ea Ly, Ea Trol, Sơn Giang and Sông Hinh.

References

Districts of Phú Yên province